The Zote people are a tribe of the Hmar people in India, Myanmar and Bangladesh.

References

1. Hmar Chanchin - Hranglien Songate (Pg-3, 25, 26, 27, 32, 33)

Hmar
Scheduled Tribes of Manipur
Kuki tribes
Headhunting
Scheduled Tribes of Meghalaya
Ethnic groups in Northeast India
Ethnic groups in South Asia